Spring Came On Forever is a 1935 novel by Bess Streeter Aldrich. One of Aldrich's "pioneer novels", it recounts the life of two American characters who head out West into the Nebraska Territory. The two, a German-speaking Lutheran girl and a blacksmith's apprentice, fall in love but their plans at marriage are thwarted by circumstances. Many years later, two descendants of theirs get married and unite two different traditions.

The novel, which speaks to the German immigration experience in the United States, was a great commercial success considering the time (the Great Depression); between October 1935 and January 1936 it sold over 45,000 copies. In March 1936, Aldrich was offered $20,000 for the movie rights, for a musical version by Oscar Hammerstein II and Jerome Kern.

In the 1980s and 1990s, the University of Nebraska Press republished a number of works by Aldrich; Spring was republished in 1985.

References

Notes

Bibliography

1935 American novels
Novels set in Nebraska